The Ghost is the third full-length album by Finnish band Before the Dawn, released on March 26, 2006, through Locomotive Music and Mazzar Records.  The album style falls under the genres of Gothic metal, death metal, and melodic death metal,  Because of the huge amount of new song material, Saukkonen created another album, The Darkness, for Dawn of Solace.

Track listing

References

External links
 Before the Dawn official website Media page

2006 albums
Before the Dawn (band) albums